The masked tanager (Stilpnia nigrocincta) is a species of bird in the family Thraupidae. It is found in Bolivia, Brazil, Colombia, Ecuador, Guyana, Peru, and Venezuela.

Its natural habitats are subtropical or tropical moist lowland forests and heavily degraded former forest.

References

Further reading

masked tanager
Birds of the Amazon Basin
masked tanager
masked tanager
Taxonomy articles created by Polbot
Taxobox binomials not recognized by IUCN